Adowa is a dance by the Akan people of Ghana. It is a popular traditional dance in Ghana and it is performed at cultural ceremonies like festivals, funerals, engagements, and celebrations. The Adowa dance is a sign of expression that allows performers to communicate their emotions and feelings through their hands and feet. There are different hand movements performed for each setting, people will communicate positive emotions at weddings or engagements and negative emotions at funerals.

References

African dances
Ghanaian culture
Ghanaian dances